The election to the United States House of Representatives in Florida was held November 5, 1872, for two seats elected at large.  This election was held at the same time as the 1872 Presidential election and the gubernatorial election.

Background
From Florida's admission to the Union in 1845, it had been represented by a single Representative. In reapportionment following the 1870 census, Florida gained a second Representative. This would be the last time that Florida's representation would be at-large (there was an at-large seat for several later Congresses, but those were in addition to districts).

Election results

Results

See also
 1872 United States presidential election in Florida
 1872 and 1873 United States House of Representatives elections
 1872 Florida gubernatorial election

References

1872
Florida
United States House of Representatives